John E. Patterson House, also known as Cashwell House, is a historic home located at Fayetteville, Cumberland County, North Carolina. It was built about 1840, and is a -story, five-bay frame coastal cottage form frame dwelling. It features a full-width, engaged front porch and Greek Revival style design elements.  It was the home of a free black brick mason and real estate speculator John E. Patterson.

It was listed on the National Register of Historic Places in 1983.

References

African-American history of North Carolina
Houses on the National Register of Historic Places in North Carolina
Greek Revival houses in North Carolina
Houses completed in 1840
Houses in Fayetteville, North Carolina
National Register of Historic Places in Cumberland County, North Carolina